MRK, Mrk, mrk may refer to:
 Merck Group, Frankfurt Stock Exchange stock ticker
 Merck & Co., New York Stock Exchange stock ticker
 MRK (visual artist)
 M. R. Krishnamurthy, a Tamil actor
 Markarian galaxy prefix, e.g. Mkr03-e (also Mrk, Mkn)
 Marco Island Airport, IATA code